The women's 1500 metres at the 2011 IPC Athletics World Championships was held at the QEII Stadium from 25–28 January 2011.

Medalists

References
 Complete Results Book from the 2011 IPC Athletics World Championships
 Official site of the 2011 IPC Athletics World Championships

1500 metres
2011 in women's athletics
1500 metres at the World Para Athletics Championships